Entomobrya lanuginosa  is a species of springtail in the genus Entomobrya.

Taxonomy and systematics
It was found to be conspecific with Entomobrya maritima, making Entomobrya maritima no longer recognized.

Description
It is a greenish to greyish-blue species that grows up to two millimeters in length. It has smooth labral papillae and a prominent spot of pigment on the head between the bases of the two antennae.

Distribution
It is found in western and central Europe, including Ireland and the UK.

References

Collembola